Variola, the lyretails, is a genus of marine ray-finned fish, groupers from the subfamily Epinephelinae, part of the family Serranidae, which also includes the anthias and sea basses. They are found in the tropical Indo-Pacific and their distribution extends from the Red Sea to South Africa across the Indian Ocean and east to the islands of the central Pacific.

Characteristics
The lyretails have an oblong shaped body which has a depth that is less than the length of the head and which has a standard length that is 2.8 to 3.2 times its depth. They have a slightly convex dorsal profile of the head  and a snout which is longer than the diameter of the eye. Both species have a rounded preopercle with a finely serrated margin and a fleshy lower margin. There are three flat spines on the gill cover which has a straight upper margin. Both the upper and lower jaws have a pair of large canine teeth at the front and there are also  1 to 3 large canines in the middle of the lower jaw There are teeth on the roof of the mouth. The dorsal fin contains 9 spines and 13 to 15 soft rays and it has its origin above the posterior end of the gill cover. The membranes between the spines of the dorsal fin are not or are only slightly incised. The anal fin has 3 separated spines and 8 soft rays. The caudal fin is crescent shaped with elongated lobes.

Habitat and biology
They are largely piscivorous.

Species
The two known species are:

References

Epinephelini